David Crockett Early College High School is a public high school located in South Austin, Texas. The school opened in 1968 and is part of the Austin Independent School District (AISD). It was named after U.S. frontiersman Davy Crockett.

History
Crockett High School is located at the corner of Menchaca Road and Stassney Lane. Crockett's first principal, Forrest Kline, teachers and students enjoyed lunch in the courtyard amongst massive boulders and oak trees because the cafeteria had not been completed.  Actor Fess Parker, best known for his 1950s portrayals of Davy Crockett for Walt Disney, attended the school's first pep rally.

In 1971, a federal judge ordered Anderson High School in East Austin closed because it was still racially segregated. African-American students from the old Anderson High School were bused to Crockett starting in the fall of that year.

Students 
As of October 2020, Crockett had an enrollment of 1,550. The student body was 73.2% Hispanic, 16.7% White, 5.9% African American, and 1% Asian. 63.4% of Crockett students were economically disadvantaged, and 18.2% were English Language Learners.

Programs
In 1980 and again in 1981 the band won First Place at the UIL State Marching Band Contest (Class 5-A) and was named "Best Band Ever" by Texas Monthly Magazine.

By 2008 the school began providing free cosmetology training through a revamped cosmetology program. Students are able to begin work immediately after high school through this program.

Beginning in the 2015-2016 school year, an Entrepreneurship program funded by the Bazaarvoice Foundation was offered. This program is the first of its kind in the Austin Independent School District, and when grouped with its sister programs in Cunningham Elementary School and Covington Middle School, it is the first K-12 Entrepreneurship Programs in the US.

Notable alumni
 Roger Huerta, professional MMA fighter
Gabriel Luna, class of 2001, actor & producer.
 Bruce Scholtz, class of 1977, former professional football player
Karen Tumulty, class of 1973, political columnist for the Washington Post

References

External links
Crockett High School
 Crockett High School Film
School Report Cards

Educational institutions established in 1968
High schools in Austin, Texas
Austin Independent School District high schools
Davy Crockett
1968 establishments in Texas